Lisa Williams (born 3 May 1991) is an Australian rules footballer who played for the Western Bulldogs in the AFL Women's competition. Williams was drafted by the Western Bulldogs with their twelfth selection and ninety-second overall in the 2016 AFL Women's draft. She made her debut in the thirty-two point win against  at VU Whitten Oval in the opening round of the 2017 season. She played six matches in her debut season. She was delisted at the conclusion of the 2017 season.

References

External links 

1991 births
Living people
Western Bulldogs (AFLW) players
Australian rules footballers from Victoria (Australia)
Victorian Women's Football League players